The Historic Summit Inn Resort, also known as the Summit Hotel, is an historic hotel complex and national historic district which is located atop the Summit Mountain of Chestnut Ridge by North Union Township and South Union Township in Farmington, Fayette County, Pennsylvania. 

It was added to the National Register of Historic Places in 2005.

History and architectural features
This historic district includes eight contributing buildings and three contributing structures. The main hotel building was built in 1907, and is a three-story, stone and stucco, Mission style building. It features a parapeted gable and two four-story square towers. The building was expanded in 1923.

Also on the property are the contributing carriage house, staff dormitory, stable/garage, two cottages, an Olympic-sized swimming pool, pool house and pavilion/concession stand, which were built circa 1923, and two water storage tanks, which were erected sometime around 1907.

This historic district was added to the National Register of Historic Places in 2005.

References

External links

Summit Inn Resort website

Hotel buildings on the National Register of Historic Places in Pennsylvania
Historic districts on the National Register of Historic Places in Pennsylvania
Hotel buildings completed in 1907
Buildings and structures in Fayette County, Pennsylvania
National Register of Historic Places in Fayette County, Pennsylvania